Audi museum mobile is an automobile museum owned and operated by Audi AG in Ingolstadt, Bavaria, Germany. Opened in 2000, it is devoted to the history of Audi and its predecessors, and is the focal point of the Audi Forum Ingolstadt.

Description

Inside the building, there is a permanent exhibition of about 50 cars and 30 motorcycles and bicycles, as well as numerous other exhibits relating to the history of the Audi, DKW, Horch, Wanderer and NSU brands.

A special feature of the museum is a paternoster lift, which displays 14 cars in constant motion.

See also
August Horch Museum Zwickau
AutoMuseum Volkswagen
Autostadt
List of automobile museums

References

Notes

Bibliography

External links

Audi Forum Ingolstadt – part of the Audi official site 

Stadt Ingolstadt: museum mobile – visitor information 
The New York Times: Touring the Temples of German Automaking – includes a description of a visit to the museum
This article is based upon a translation of the German language version as at October 2013.

Audi
Automobile museums in Germany
Ingolstadt
Museums in Bavaria